Phytoecia pseudafricana is a species of beetle in the family Cerambycidae. It was described by Stephan von Breuning in 1951. It is known from Kenya and Uganda.

References

Phytoecia
Beetles described in 1951